Calzavara a surname. Notable people with the surname include:

Amalia Calzavara (born 1966), Italian sprint canoer
Fabio Calzavara (1950–2019), Italian entrepreneur and politician
Flavio Calzavara (1900–1981), Italian film director and screenwriter

Italian-language surnames